The men's 5000 metres competition at the 2020 European Speed Skating Championships was held on 11 January 2020.

Results
The race was started at 16:08.

References

Men's 5000 metres